The 1994 Jordanian  League (known as The Jordanian  League,   was the 44th season of Jordan League since its inception in 1944. Al-Wehdat won its 4th title.

Teams

Map

League table

Overview
Al-Wehdat won the championship.

References

Jordanian Pro League seasons
Jordan
football
football